Emma Goes to Bollywood is a 2005 British documentary film produced and broadcast by BBC Two. It was directed by Louis Theroux and released on 12 June 2005. It stars Emma Bunton on her travel to Bollywood.

Summary
Emma Bunton goes to Mumbai, India, where she will record two films – Pyaar Mein Twist and Chocolate. For four weeks, Bunton assimilates into Indian culture and she was interviewed by several Asia's radios and TV to promote her debut in Bollywood. Meanwhile, the Indian actress Sameera Reddy goes to United Kingdom to record the medical drama series Casualty.

Cast
Emma Bunton
Sameera Reddy

Production
In 2005 Bunton signed with the BBC to record a documentary in India, where he would know the culture and would be part of some productions in Bollywood. Three films were offered to her and she chose Pyaar Mein Twist to be part of the cast. Then she was also invited to star in Chocolate.

References

Emma Bunton
2005 television films
2005 films
BBC television documentaries
British documentary films
Documentary films about entertainers
2005 documentary films
BBC Film films
Documentary films about women in music
Documentary films about the cinema of India
2000s British films